The 1991 Muratti Time Indoor, known as such for sponsorship reasons, was a men's tennis tournament played on indoor carpet courts at the recently opened Assago Forum in Milan, Italy. It was the 14th edition of the tournament, and was part of the ATP World Series of the 1991 ATP Tour. It took place from 4 February until 10 February 1991 and eighth-seeded Alexander Volkov won the singles title.

Finals

Singles
 Alexander Volkov defeated  Cristiano Caratti, 6–1, 7–5
 It was Volkov's first singles title of his career.

Doubles
 Omar Camporese /  Goran Ivanišević defeated  Tom Nijssen /  Cyril Suk, 6–4, 7–6

References

External links
 ITF tournament edition details

Milan Indoor
Milan Indoor
Milan Indoor
Milan Indoor